Llandovery College is a coeducational independent boarding and day school in Llandovery, Carmarthenshire, Wales. The college consists of Gollop Preparatory, Senior School and Sixth Form. It was previously known as "Welsh College, Llandovery" and "Collegiate Institute" at various periods of its history.

History
Llandovery College was founded by Thomas Phillips in 1847, a surgeon and later, plantation owner. After the passing of the Slavery Abolition Act 1833 he was compensated £4737 8s 6d in 1836 for the release of 167 slaves. of which he used £4,600 to build Llandovery College. He wanted the school to offer a classical and liberal education in which the Welsh language, the study of Welsh literature and history, were to be cultivated. The town of Llandovery was decided upon "because of its central position and because of easy communication with all parts of South Wales". Also important was “the great beauty and healthiness of the locality and the absence of manufacturing industries". The school first opened with a handful of boys on St David's Day 1848. On 13 December 1849, the foundation stone of the present building was laid.

Between 1901 and 1903, alterations were made to the existing school, and new buildings were added, by the Lancaster architects Austin and Paley. The additional buildings included the east range, a school house, and a dining room, at a cost of about £10,000. During his visit in 1902, Sir James Williams-Drummond, 4th Baronet Hawthornden described the school as the "Eton of Wales."

They have named their newest building the 'Thomas Phillips Centre' after their founder.

The first girls were admitted during the late 1960s. Gollop Preparatory School, the prep department which was named after the Chairman of Governors Ian Gollop, was opened to pupils aged 7–11 in 2001. A nursery was added and the intake was extended to age 4 for the 2012–13 school year.

Between 2014 - 2015, they paid out 'tens of thousands of pounds' in compensation to former employees.

Architecture
The school building is designated by Cadw as a Grade II listed building.

Curriculum
All pupils in the preparatory school and up to Year 9 are required to learn Welsh.

On St David's Day 2011, the college opened Wales' first Confucius classroom to facilitate the teaching of Mandarin Chinese, with Prince Charles and Chinese Ambassador to the UK Liu Xiaoming both in attendance.

Extracurricular activities
Sports available include football, cricket, hockey, netball, Rugby and athletics.

Facilities

Links with rugby union
Llandovery College has connections with the early adoption of rugby into Wales. Although St David's College, Lampeter is accepted as the first establishment to play rugby, Llandovery was one of their first opponents, were present at the formation of the Welsh Rugby Union in Neath in 1881 and provided two players to the very first international game Wales played. The second captain of the Welsh national team, Charles Lewis, represented Llandovery College and was the first Wales captain to lead a team in the Home Nations Championship.

Notable former pupils and staff

Former staff members
 Owen Phillips, college warden (1854–61) and third Dean of St David's
 Samuel Ogden Andrew (1868-1952), classics master and translator of Homer

Old Llandoverians
Ex pupils are known as Old Llandoverians and belong to the Old Llandoverian Society.

 Huw Ceredig, actor who played Reg Harries in the soap opera Pobol y Cwm
 A. G. Edwards, Archbishop of Wales
 Deian Hopkin, historian
 Dill Jones, jazz pianist
 Ernest Jones, Welsh neurologist, psychoanalyst and official biographer of Sigmund Freud
 Glyn Mathias, political editor of Independent Television News (1981–1986) and BBC Wales (1994–1999), the Electoral Commission's Commissioner for Wales (2001–2008) and a board member of OFCOM (2011–present)
 Llywarch Reynolds, Welsh solicitor and Celtic scholar
 Mervyn Johns, Welsh film and television character actor 
 Rod Richards, Conservative Party politician
 Rhydian Roberts, The X Factor contestant
 Robert Jermain Thomas, Christian missionary 
 Peter Warren, archaeologist and academic specialising in the Aegean Bronze Age
 Gwilym Owen Williams, Bishop of Bangor
 W. Llewelyn Williams, Liberal Party politician

Rugby players
 Ewan Davies
 Geoff Evans, British Lion
 Vivian Jenkins, British Lion
 Alun Wyn Jones, British Lion
 Cliff Jones, Wales captain
 Gwyn Jones, Wales captain
 Kingsley Daniel Jones, British Lion
 Rhodri Jones
 Charles Lewis, the second Wales international rugby union captain 1882–83
 Edward John Lewis, first Wales international
 George North British Lion
 Andy Powell
 Craig Quinnell
 Harry Randall England International
 Arthur Rees
 Peter Rogers
 Rees Stephens, Wales captain and British Lion

See also
 List of non-ecclesiastical works by Austin and Paley (1895–1914)

References

External links 

 Llandovery College
 Profile on the ISC website
 Estyn Inspection Reports

Educational institutions established in 1847
Private schools in Carmarthenshire
1847 establishments in Wales
Boarding schools in Wales

Austin and Paley buildings
Grade II listed buildings in Carmarthenshire
Llandovery
Wardens of Llandovery College